Kosmos 1275 ( meaning Cosmos 1275) was a part of a 6-satellite Soviet military navigation system distributed in orbital planes spaced 30 degrees apart, and launched from the Plesetsk cosmodrome aboard a Cosmos rocket. It is believed to be the first satellite destroyed by untracked Satellite debris.

Kosmos 1275 was launched from the Plesetsk Cosmodrome in the Russian SSR on 4 June 1981. On July 24, 1981, at 23.51 GMT, it suddenly ceased operations and broke into more 300 large pieces of debris and many other too small to track. Because it had no propellant on board, it was believed that there was nothing internal that could have led to its break-up.

See also

 1981 in spaceflight
 List of Kosmos satellites (1251–1500)

References

Kosmos satellites
Spacecraft launched in 1981
Spacecraft that broke apart in space